The 2001 Polish Film Awards was the 3rd edition of Polish Film Awards: Eagles.

Awards winners

Special awards

 Life Achievement Award: Stanisław Różewicz
 Special Award: Roman Polanski, Stanisław Pacuk

External links
 2001 Polish Film Awards at IMDb

Polish Film Awards ceremonies
Polish Film Awards
Polish Film Awards, 2001